A mineral acid (or inorganic acid) is an acid derived from one or more inorganic compounds, as opposed to organic acids which are acidic, organic compounds. All mineral acids form hydrogen ions and the conjugate base when dissolved in water.

Characteristics
Commonly used mineral acids are sulfuric acid (H2SO4), hydrochloric acid (HCl) and nitric acid (HNO3, they are also known as bench acids). Mineral acids range from superacids (perchloric acid) to very weak ones (boric acid). Mineral acids tend to be very soluble in water and insoluble in organic solvents.

Mineral acids are used in many sectors of the chemical industry as feedstocks for the synthesis of other chemicals, both organic and inorganic.  Large quantities of these acids – especially sulfuric acid, nitric acid, and hydrochloric acid – are manufactured for commercial use in large plants.

Mineral acids are also used directly for their corrosive properties. For example, a dilute solution of hydrochloric acid is used for removing the deposits from the inside of boilers, with precautions taken to prevent the corrosion of the boiler by the acid. This process is known as descaling.

Examples
 Hydrochloric acid HCl
 Nitric acid HNO3
 Phosphoric acid H3PO4
 Sulfuric acid H2SO4
 Boric acid H3BO3
 Hydrofluoric acid HF
 Hydrobromic acid HBr
 Perchloric acid HClO4
 Hydroiodic acid HI

References

External links 
 Mineral Acids: Reregistration Eligibility Decision Fact Sheet – U.S. Environmental Protection Agency